Carapicuíba is a municipality in the state of São Paulo in Brazil. It is part of the Metropolitan Region of São Paulo. It is one of the most densely populated municipalities in the state of São Paulo.

History 
Before the first white man arrived, the region which today is Carapicuíba was inhabited by indigenous people. The hamlet was founded by José de Anchieta. Afonso Sardinha settled there with his farm with the will to use the indigenous people as a workforce. He then built a chapel. The indigenous people soon reacted to the European occupation, and rushed into the jungle. By the 17th century, it was part of the recently created municipality of Santana do Parnaíba. Nothing much has changed in the hamlet during this century and the most of the 18th one.

From 1770 on, however, the city and its surroundings started to change noticeably, as new villages were settled, like Embu and Cotia. Houses were built around the main chapel, in which several "entrepreneur" (actually, people who arranged the parties with folklore-related themes) lived.

Until the Sorocabana Railway was implemented, in 1870, little was developed in the village. However, when a station was opened near the section of the tracks that run through the city, many people started to live in the city. During the first half of the 20th century, agriculture started to play a role in the economy of the village, because of the climate and quality of the land. A bus line starting in Barueri, running through Carapicuíba, Osasco and ending in Pinheiros was created to take people to São Paulo in alternate itineraries.

In 1948, Carapicuíba became a district of Cotia, when it became independent from São Paulo. A year later, it became part of Barueri, also as a district.

In 1952 the Parish Nossa Senhora Aparecida was built, and is now known as "Igreja Amarela" (Yellow Church), and the city population kept on increasing. The post-war times saw the vertiginous decrease of the prospecting in Minas Gerais, which led a large number of people to go to São Paulo state, a number of them settling in the city.

In the early 1960s, a movement in favor of the independence of Carapicuíba was led by the mayor of Barueri, Carlos Capriotti, and the district earned its city status in March 1965

In 2007-2008, the city gained national attention due to the Paturis Park murders.

Origin of the name 
According to Professor Eduardo de Almeida Navarro, titular professor at the Faculdade de Filosofia, Letras e Ciências Humanas of University of São Paulo, the name has a controversial origin and may come from the Tupi language or Lingua Geral of São Paulo and may have different significations:
 "peziza (a fungus that is) inappropriate (to be eaten)" (karapuku, peziza + aíb, inappropriate + a, suffix)
 "carapicus (a fish) rotten (inappropriate to be eaten)" (akará, acará + puku, long + aíb, rotten + a, suffix)
 "carapicu tree (a kind of shrub)" (carapicu, carapicu + ' yba, tree)
Some people say that it may also come from Quar-I-Picui-Bae, name given by Indians to a small river delimiting a border between the city with Osasco and Cotia.

Geography 
The border with Barueri is a large plain formed by the side of the Rio Tietê. The exploration of sand in the area was so intensive that a large crater was formed. However, during the 1960s, the government of São Paulo state started a series of works to alter the route of the river, and the destruction of the wall between the river and the crater led to the flooding of it. Now, the place has become an artificial lake called "Lagoa de Carapicuíba" (Carapicuíba Lake). 8 thousand litres of sewage from the central, western and southern portions of the city of São Paulo pass through the lake towards Barueri. The average altitude is 717 meters and the climate is in general a humid subtropical climate.

Economy 

As of 2005, the city has a GDP of R$1,915,285,000.00 and a GDP per capita of R$5,004

Transportation 

The city is served by the Line 8 of São Paulo commuter rail, having two stations within the area of the municipality and a third one just after the border with Osasco. Three Bus services serve the city: ETT Carapicuíba and Del Rey Transportes, with municipal and inter municipal lines, and Viação Osasco, with intermunicipal lines only.

Highways 
There are no highways crossing Carapicuíba, though the Rodoanel Mário Covas marks most of the border with Osasco and provides some accesses to the city, as well as serving as the main connection to the other highways and the city of São Paulo itself. The Rodovia Castelo Branco passes just north of the city, in Barueri. It is also possible to access Carapicuíba from the Rodovia Raposo Tavares, which runs just south of it in the city of Cotia, and from Osasco via the Avenida dos Autonomistas.

Notable people 
 Leonardo de Jesus Geraldo, footballer
 Amauri Carvalho de Oliveira, footballer

References

External links
 Carapicuíba City Hall 
 Carapicuíba on citybrazil.com.br 
 History of Carapicuíba at City Hall Website
 Geography of Carapicuíba at City Hall Website
 EncontraCarapicuíba - Find everything about Carapicuíba

 
Populated places established in 1580